Brian Gibson (22 September 1944 – 4 January 2004) was an English film and television director.

Early life and education
Gibson was born 22 September 1944 in Southend-on-Sea, Essex. His mother, Victoria, was a shop assistant and his father was a carpenter. He had a sister, June. Gibson attended Southend High School for Boys. He attended St Catharine's College, Cambridge, where he studied medicine. He also studied History of Science at Darwin College, Cambridge. He graduated from Cambridge University.

Career
In the late 1960s, Gibson began working for the BBC, directing scientific documentaries. Gibson directed Helen Mirren in the 1979 BBC film Blue Remembered Hills and his work on that film won him a BAFTA Award for Best Director. Gibson made his feature film directorial debut with Breaking Glass (1980). In 1986, he directed Poltergeist II: The Other Side. In 1989, he directed Ben Kingsley in the HBO television film Murderers Among Us: The Simon Wiesenthal Story. In 1990, Gibson directed the miniseries Drug Wars: The Camarena Story, starring Steven Bauer and Benicio Del Toro. Gibson won a Primetime Emmy and a Directors Guild of America Award for directing the HBO television film The Josephine Baker Story (1991). In 1993, he directed the Oscar nominated film What's Love Got to Do with It, starring Angela Bassett and Laurence Fishburne. This led to a first look deal with Touchstone Pictures. In 1996, he directed Demi Moore and Alec Baldwin in The Juror. In 1998, he directed the British film Still Crazy starring Bill Nighy and Billy Connolly. Gibson served as an executive producer for Frida (2002), starring Salma Hayek and Alfred Molina. He was preparing to direct a film for 20th Century Fox, and also collaborating on a script with his wife when he was diagnosed with cancer.

Personal life and death
Gibson had homes in London and Los Angeles.

In 1990, Gibson married Lynn Whitfield. They have a daughter Grace. Their marriage ended in divorce. After their divorce he married the artist Paula Rae Gibson, with whom he had another daughter, Raphaela.

Gibson died of bone cancer in London on 4 January 2004; he was 59.

Filmography
 1974 : Horizon (BBC TV series) (ep: Joey)
 1976 : The Billion Dollar Bubble
 1976 : Where Adam Stood
 1979 : Screenplay (série TV)
 1979 : Gossip from the Forest
 1979 : Blue Remembered Hills
 1980 : Breaking Glass
 1983 : Kilroy Was Here
 1986 : Poltergeist II: The Other Side
 1989 : Murderers Among Us: The Simon Wiesenthal Story
 1990 : Drug Wars: The Camarena Story
 1991 : The Josephine Baker Story
 1993 : What's Love Got to Do with It
 1996 : The Juror
 1998 : Still Crazy

References

External links
 
 

1944 births
2004 deaths
Alumni of St Catharine's College, Cambridge
Alumni of Darwin College, Cambridge
Deaths from cancer in England
Deaths from bone cancer
English film directors
English television directors
Primetime Emmy Award winners
People from Southend-on-Sea
English expatriates in the United States